Gorea may refer to:
Gorean, from the planet Gor in the science fiction novels by John Norman
Gorea, the main antagonist of the video game Metroid Prime Hunters